Stadio Lino Turina is a multi-use stadium in Salò, Italy.  It is currently used mostly for football matches and is the home ground of FeralpiSalò. The stadium holds 2,364.

External links
Stadio Lino Turina at Soccerway

Lino Turina